Dimitar Stoyanov (born 14 April 2001) is a Bulgarian professional footballer who plays as a midfielder for Strumska Slava.

References

External links

2001 births
Living people
Bulgarian footballers
Bulgaria under-21 international footballers
Bulgaria youth international footballers
Association football midfielders
First Professional Football League (Bulgaria) players
PFC Slavia Sofia players
PFC Beroe Stara Zagora players